Splendrillia benthicola is a species of sea snail, a marine gastropod mollusk in the family Drilliidae.

Description
The length of the shell is 25 mm, its diameter 9.5 mm.

Distribution
This marine species is endemic to New Zealand and occurs off Chatham Rise, East of South Island, New Zealand at depths between 360 m and 530 m.

References

 Dell, Richard Kenneth. The archibenthal mollusca of New Zealand. Dominion Museum, 1956.
 Powell, A.W.B. 1979: New Zealand Mollusca: Marine, Land and Freshwater Shells, Collins, Auckland

External links
 
  Spencer H.G., Willan R.C., Marshall B.A. & Murray T.J. (2011). Checklist of the Recent Mollusca Recorded from the New Zealand Exclusive Economic Zone

benthicola
Gastropods described in 1956